A Christian Hebraist is a scholar of Hebrew who comes from a Christian family background/belief, or is a Jewish adherent of Christianity. The main area of study is that commonly known as the Old Testament to Christians (and Tanakh to Jews), but Christians have occasionally taken an interest in the Talmud, and Kabbalah.

The early fathers of the Christian Church got their knowledge of Hebrew traditions (Masoretic, Midrashim, Aggadah) from their Jewish teachers. This is seen especially in the exegesis of Justin Martyr, Aphraates, Ephraem Syrus, and Origen of Alexandria. Jerome's teachers are even mentioned by name—e.g., Bar Ḥanina (Hananiah).

Middle Ages
Syriac Christians have always been reading and using Hebrew texts. In western Christianity, however, knowledge of Hebrew was historically scarce outside of converts from Judaism. It has often been claimed that the Venerable Bede (d.735) knew something of Hebrew, but his knowledge appears to have been gleaned entirely from St Jerome. The same may be said of Alcuin (b. 735), who revised the Biblical translation of Jerome. The ninth-century Pseudo-Jerome, who worked in the circle of Rabanus Maurus (d.856), had knowledge of Hebrew.

During the Twelfth-Century Renaissance, contact between Christian and Jewish scholars increased. Peter Abelard (d.1142) recommended Christian scholars take up the language of the Old Testament and many followed this recommendation. The School of Saint Victor became the centre of Hebraism in western Europe. The school of Toledo also worked with Hebrew, but it was secondary to Arabic. Adam of Saint Victor (d.1146) was the most prominent Victorine Hebraist and his student, Herbert of Bosham (fl.1162–89), studied with Abraham ibn Ezra (d.c.1167) to acquire deeper grammatical understanding. The Cistercian tradition of Hebrew studies began with Nicholas Manjacoria.

In the thirteenth century, Hebrew learning declined among native Christians, while converts from Judaism mainly used their knowledge polemically against their co-ethnics. The tradition of scholarly Hebraism was strongest in England. Among the prominent English Hebraists were Alexander Neckham (d.1217); Stephen Langton (d.1228), who composed a Hebrew–Latin dictionary of Biblical terms; William de la Mare (fl.1272–79), who was patronised by Robert Grosseteste (d.1253); and Roger Bacon (d.c.1292), who wrote  Hebrew grammar.

In the fourteenth century, the Franciscans and Dominicans took up Hebrew, but their purpose was evangelical. They were instrumental, however, in setting up chairs of Hebrew in universities across Europe. The ecumenical Council of Vienne (1312) ordered chairs established at the universities of Rome, Oxford, Paris, Salamanca and Bologna. Paris had the leading Hebraist of the period in Nicholas of Lyra (d.1349), while following him was Bishop Paul of Burgos (d.1435), a Jewish convert.

Renaissance
It was not, however, until the end of the 15th century that the Renaissance and the Reformation, while awakening a new interest in the classics, brought about a return to the original text of Scripture and an attempt to understand the later literature of the Jews. Hieronymus Buslidius, the friend of Erasmus, gave more than 20,000 francs to establish a Hebrew chair at Louvain; as the chair of Hebrew at the University of Paris, Francis offered the chair to Elijah Levita, the friend of Cardinal Ægidius of Viterbo, who declined to accept it. Cardinal Grimani and other dignitaries, both of the state and of the Church, studied Hebrew and the Kabbalah with Jewish teachers; even the warrior Guido Rangoni attempted the Hebrew language with the aid of Jacob Mantino (1526). Pico de la Mirandola (d. 1494) was the first to collect Hebrew manuscripts, and Reuchlin was the first to write a dictionary and short grammar of the Hebrew language (1506). A more detailed grammar was published by Otto Walper in 1590. But interest still centered wholly around the Bible and the expository literature immediately connected therewith.

During the whole of the 16th century it was Hebrew grammar and Jewish exegesis that claimed attention. Christian scholars were not ashamed to be the students of Jewish teachers. In fact, one of the most noted Hebraists of this period was Immanuel Tremellius (1510-1580), born Jewish and converted first to Catholicism and soon thereafter became a Calvinist, producing the main Reformed translation of the Hebrew Bible into Latin (he also translated the New Testament from the Syriac into Latin). Sebastian Münster (d. 1552) was known as a grammarian; Pellicanus (d. 1556) and Pagninius (d. 1541), as lexicographers; Daniel Bomberg (d. 1549), as a printer of Hebrew books. Arius Montanus (d. 1598) edited the Masorah and the Travels of Benjamin of Tudela. Widmanstadt (1523), living in a colony of Spanish Jewish refugees in Naples, studied Hebrew with David ibn Ya'ya and Baruch of Benevento, and collected the Hebrew manuscripts which formed the basis of the Hebrew division of the Royal Library at Munich. Vatablé (d. 1547) made use of Rashi's commentary. Conrad Gesner (d. 1565) was the first Christian to compile a catalogue of Hebrew books; Jacob Christmann (d. 1613) busied himself with the Jewish calendar, and Drusius (d. 1616) with the ethical writings of the Jews.

17th century

Johannes Buxtorf (d. 1629) marks a turning-point in the study of Jewish literature by Christians. He not only studied the Targum and the Talmud, but endeavored to understand Jewish history, and he was the first real bibliographer. Women showed an interest: Anna Maria van Schurman, the "star of the century", in the Dutch Republic; Dorothea Moore in England; Queen Christina of Sweden (d. 1689); Maria Dorothea, consort of the Duke of Saxe-Weimar; Elizabeth, daughter of Frederick of the Palatinate; Maria Eleanora, wife of Charles Ludwig of the Palatinate; Antonia, daughter of Duke Eberhard of Württemberg.

Through Buxtorf a serious attempt was made to understand the post-Biblical literature, and many of the most important works were translated into Latin. In this connection the following names may be mentioned: Johannes Cocceius (d. 1667); Constantin L'Empereur (d. 1648); John Lightfoot (d. 1675); Johann Leusden (d. 1699); and especially Surenhuis (1698), who gave a complete translation of the Mishnah; Jewish theology was studied by Carpzov (d. 1699), Wagenseil (1705; whose letters show how he gathered information), and Johann Stephan Rittangel (1641); antiquities, by Samuel Bochart (d. 1667), Hottinger (d. 1667), Hyde (d. 1700), Trigland (d. 1705), Breithaupt (1707), and Johann Jakob Schudt (d. 1722). It was a time in which the Christian theologian studied Hebrew and rabbinics before taking up his specific theological study. Hackspan (d. 1659) wrote upon the value to the theologian of studying the works of the Rabbis. Their writings on the Bible were read by Schickard (1635), Humphrey Hody (d. 1706), and Richard Simon (d. 1712), while catalogues of Hebrew collections were published by Plantavitius (d. 1651), Le Long (d. 1721), and Montfaucon (d. 1741). Hottinger gave this literature a place in his Bibliotheca Orientalis; Otho (1672) wrote a biographical lexicon of the Mishnah teachers; and Bartolocci's Bibliotheca Rabbinica (1675) was a worthy continuation of these bibliographical labors.

18th century

The first half of the 18th century contains the names of three important scholars. Jacques Basnage knew no Hebrew, but his L'Histoire de la Religion des Juifs was the first attempt at a complete presentation of the history of Judaism. The Entdecktes Judenthum of Eisenmenger (d.1704) exhibits a mass of Jewish learning. Johann Christoph Wolf (d. 1739), who, with the help of the Oppenheimer library, was able to produce his Bibliotheca Hebræa, which laid the foundation for all later works in Hebrew bibliography.

Johann Christian Georg Bodenschatz (d. 1797), though not a scholarly Hebraist, gave an accurate account of Jewish ceremonials. By the side of these stand Bashuysen (d. 1750), the translator and printer of Hebrew books; Reland (d. 1718), the first to use Talmudic material for the study of the geography of Palestine; the bibliographers Unger (d. 1719) and Gagnier (d. 1720), who gave Wolf his information regarding the manuscripts in the Bodleian; J. H. Michaelis (d. 1738) and Mai (d. 1732), who compiled a catalogue of the Uffenbach library; Baratier (d. 1740), the youthful prodigy, who wrote on Benjamin of Tudela; Mill (d. 1756), who treated rabbinical exegesis; and Wähner (1762), who described Hebrew antiquities. Biagio Ugolini (1744) is said to have been a converted Jew, and therefore finds no place here. Special mention should be made of Ezra Stiles, the learned president of Yale College (1778), certainly the most learned Christian student of post-Biblical Jewish literature that America has produced.

Early 19th century

Towards the end of the 18th century such friends of Hebrew literature became ever rarer. The rise of Biblical criticism and of the study of other Semitic languages engaged the whole interest of Semitic scholars.

Even Rabe, the translator of the Mishnah into German (d. 1798), Semmler, Michaelis, Tychsen (d. 1815), and Sylvestre de Sacy (d. 1838) can hardly be mentioned by the side of the humanists of previous centuries. Interest in the text of the Bible caused some work to be done in the collecting of Hebrew manuscripts, especially by Benjamin Kennicott in England (1776–80) and Giovanni Bernardo De Rossi in Italy (1784–88). The last-named made a valuable collection of Hebrew manuscripts; and by his side may be mentioned Joseph Pasinus (or Giuseppe Passini) in Turin (d. 1749), Antonio Maria Biscioni in Florence (d. 1752), Giuseppe Simone Assemani in Rome, and Ury in Oxford (d. 1787).

At the universities

The downward trend continued in the first half of the 19th century; Jewish literature became less and less a subject of investigation by Christians; and when it was studied it was generally for the purpose of forging weapons against the people whose literature it was. This is seen in such works as A. T. Hartmann's Thesaurus Linguæ Hebr. c Mischna Augendi (1825), in Winer's Biblisches Real Wörterbuch, and even in the works of Hitzig and Ewald. There was no understanding even of the period of Jewish history during which Christianity arose and developed; and David Strauss's complaint in regard to this was only too well founded.

During the second half of the 19th century, however, the idea gained currency that there was something to be learned by going back to the sources of this history; but only a very few of the universities made a place for this study in their curricula. At the beginning of the 18th century David Rudolph of Liegnitz included Rabbinisch und Chaldäisch among the Oriental languages which he taught at Heidelberg; but he had few imitators; and in the 19th century, apart from a few stray courses, such as Emil Kautzsch's on Kimhi at Tübingen, Lagarde's on Al-Ḥarizi at Göttingen, and Strack's on the Mishnah at Berlin, the whole of rabbinic literature was ignored by European universities.

Honorable exceptions in this respect were furnished in the universities of Oxford (where A. Cowley was sublibrarian of the Bodleian Library) and Cambridge (which has produced such scholars as W. H. Lowe, Matthews, and Charles Taylor) in England, and in Columbia University, the University of California, the University of Chicago, Harvard University, and Johns Hopkins University, in America. The Jews had been allowed to work out by themselves the new Jewish science (Jüdische Wissenschaft), little attention being paid to that work by others.

In more recent times Christian scholars have given Jewish literature their attention. Abbé Pietro Perreau has done good service by his many articles on the literature of the Jews in the Middle Ages and by the assistance he has given to scholars from the Hebrew manuscripts at Parma; Martin Hartmann has translated and commentated the "Meteḳ Sefatayim" of Immanuel Frances (Berlin, 1894); Thomas Robinson has collected some good material in his The Evangelists and the Mishna (1859). August Wünsche, in his "Erläuterung der Evangelien aus Midrasch und Talmud" (1878), enlarged the scope of the inquiry begun by Lightfoot; and his translations from the Midrash opened up the stores of ancient Jewish exegesis. Weber's System der Altsynagogalen Palestinischen Theologie (1880) was, with all its failings, an honest attempt to understand the theology of the Synagogue, followed by Wilhelm Bousset in his Religiondes Judenthums im Neutestamentlichen Zeitalter (1903). Dom Pedro II, Emperor of Brazil, should also be mentioned for his publication of Provençal Jewish poetry.

Late 19th century

The Institutum Judaicum in Leipzig, founded by Franz Delitzsch, and a similar society bearing the same name in Berlin and founded by Hermann Strack, have attempted, by their various publications, to diffuse in the Christian world a knowledge of Jewish writings. Gustav Dalman has shown by his philological works on Talmudic grammar and lexicography that he is at home in the rabbinic writings. Hermann Strack in Berlin demands special mention not only for his publications dealing with the literature of the Mishnah and the Talmud, but also on account of the fearless manner in which he has combated anti-Semitic prejudice, drawing his material directly from the original sources. Carl Siegfried, in his yearly reports in the Theologischer Jahresbericht, for many years called attention to publications on Jewish subjects, and the mention of such works in the Orientalische Bibliographie has served to bring them more closely to the attention of Christian scholars. The roll of Christian Hebraists in England includes the names of J. W. Etheridge, the author of a popular Introduction to [post-Biblical] Hebrew Literature (1856); Thomas Chenery, translator of Legends from the Midrash (1877), and editor of Al-Ḥarizi's translation of Ḥariri; and W. H. Lowe, who edited the Palestinian recension of the Mishnah.

In spite, however, of these facts and of the warning given by Lagarde (Symmicta, ii. 147; Mittheilungen, ii. 165), that in order to understand the Bible text itself a deep study of the Halakah is necessary, Christian writers on the life of Jesus continue their disregard of the primary sources. This may be seen in Hausrath's Neutestamentliche Zeitgeschichte (Kaufmann Gedenkbuch, p. 659), and even in Schürer (Gesch.), who, though making a great advance upon previous efforts, still relies upon second-hand sources for many of the pictures that he draws (see Abrahams in "J. Q. R." xi. 628). Adolf von Harnack, who, in his Dogmengeschichte (3d ed.), endeavors to do some justice to the rabbis of old, in his Wesen des Christenthums (1900), sustains potential historical inaccuracies from a perhaps selective review of Jewish literature of the relevant period, possibly most noticeable in a lack of regard for the Jewish literature and history during the most recent eighteen hundred years.

List of Christian Hebraists
The following list of Christian Hebraists includes material taken from the Jewish Encyclopedia (1906), compiled upon the basis of Steinschneider's article mentioned in the bibliography below. Christian students of the Bible more generally were not included, as they may be found in other articles.

A
 Aarhus, Peter Sim. (c. 1711; Hafen ?)
 Abicht, Jo. Ge. (d. 1740; Wittenberg)
 Adler, Jac. Ge Chr. (d. 1805; Copenhagen)
 Ægidius de Viterbo (1471–1532; Italy)
 Alberta Katherina (17th century; Bohemia)
 Alfonso de Leon Zamora (16th century)
 Allixius, Petrus (17th century; Alençon)
 Alting, Jacob (17th century; Groningen, Dutch Republic)
 Amoena Amalia (wife of Duke Louis; d. 1625, Anhalt)
 Amoena, Louise (princess; 17th century; Anhalt)
 Anna Sophia, Abbess (c. 1658; Quedlinburg)
 Anna (Weissbrucker) Urban (16th century)
 Anchersen, Matthias (d. 1741; Jutland)
 Anslus, Gerebrard (17th century)
 Antonia, Duchess (d. 1679; Württemberg)
 Arias Montanus (Benedictine; d. 1598; Seville)
 Armengaud Blaise (d. 1312; Montpellier)
 Arnd, Joshua (c. 1626; Güstrow)
 Arnoldus, Michael (c. 1680; Dutch Republic)
 Asp, Matth. (1696–1763; Upsala)
 Assemani, Simon (d. 1821; Padua)
 Aubry, Esaias (c. 1730; Berlin ?)

B
 Bacon, Roger (1214–94; Oxford)
 Baldi, Bernardino (1553–1617; Urbino)
 Baratier, Johann Philipp/Jean-Phillipe (1721–40; Schwabach)
 Barozzi, Francesco (d. 1587; Italy)
 Bartolocci, Giulio (1613–87; Rome)
 Heinrich Jacob Bashuysen (1679–1750; Hanau)
 Baynus, Rudolphus (c. 1554; Paris)
 Beckmann, Jo. Christ. (c. 1677; Frankfurt-an-der-Oder)
 Becks, Matth. Frid. (1649–1701; Augsburg)
 Bedwell, William (1561–1632; London)
 Beelen, Ian Theodor (c. 1841; Amsterdam)
 Beke, Matth. (c. 1708; Amsterdam)
 Bellermann, Johann Joachim (1754–1842; Erfurt)
 Bengel (?), Eric (c. 1692; Sweden)
 Bernard, Edward (1638–96; Oxford)
 Bircherode, Jan. (1623–86; Copenhagen)
 Biscioni, Anton. Maria (1674–1756; Florence)
 Philipp Johann Bleibtreu (c. 1699; Frankfort-on-the-Main)
 Blesilla (5th century)
 Bodecker, Stephan (Bishop; c. 1438; Brandenburg)
 Bohlius, Sam. (1611–89; Rostock)
 Borel, Adam, Jun. (1603–67; Zealand)
 Böschenstein (?), Jo. (b. 1472; Austria)
 Bourdelot (c. 1619; Paris)
 Breithaupt, Joh. Fred. (1639–1713; Gotha)
 Brighenti, Gio. Ant. (d. 1702; Verona)
 Broughton, Hugh (1549–1612; Tottenham)
 Sir Thomas Browne (1605–82)
 Buddaeus, Jo. Fr. (Johann Franz Buddeus) (1667–1729; Halle?)
 Burgonovo, Archangelus (Minorite; 16th century; Pozzo)
 Buxtorf, Johannes I. (1564–1629; Basel)
 Buxtorf, Johannes II. (1599–1664; Basel)
 Buxtorf, Johannes Jakob (1645–1705; Basel)
 Buxtorf, Johannes Jakob (1663–1732; Basel)

C
 Cademannus, Jos. Rud. (Johann Rudolf Cademann) (1680–1720; Pegau)
 Calonges, Madame de
 Campen, Joh. van (John van Campen) (1490–1538; Freiburg-im-Breisgau)
 Caninius, Angelus (1521–57; Paris)
 Cappellan, Claud. (d. 1667; Paris)
 Carpzov, Johann (Benedictine; 1639–99; Leipzig)
 Cartwright, Christopher (1602–58; York)
 Castell, Edmund (1606–85; Higham Gobion)
 Castro, Joh. Rodriguez de (1739–96; Madrid)
 Cellarius (?), Jo. (c. 1518)
 Chenery, Thomas (1826–84; London)
 Chevalier, Antoine Rodolphe (1523–1572); France)
 Chiarini, Luigi (Abbé; 1789–1832; Warsaw)
 Christmann, Jac. (1554–1613; Heidelberg)
 Chytraeus, D. (c. 1551)
 Cibo—? (wife of Joh. Verano, Duke of Camerino; 1550)
 Ciselius, Phil. (c. 1696; Franeker)
 Clanner (J. G. ?) (c. 1726 ?)
 Samuel Clark (c. 1657; Oxford)
 Clavering, Robert (Bishop; 1671–1747; Peterborough)
 Clodius, Jo. Chr. (d. 1633; Leipzig)
 Cluverus, Jo. (17th century)
 Cnollen, Adam Andreas (1674–1714; Füth)
 Cnollen, Jos. Nicol. (brother of preceding)
 Coccejus (Koch), Jo. (1603–69; Leyden)
 Coddaeus, Giul. (Wilhelmus van der Codde) (1575–1630; Leyden)
 Collin, C. E. (c. 1705; Giessen)
 Collins, G. (c. 1890; Oxford)
 Cornaro, Piscopia Cornelia (Eleonora Lucretia; (1646–1684) ; Venice)
 Costus, Petrus (c. 1554)
 Cotta, Johann Friedrich (1701–79; Tübingen)
 Cramer, Anna Maria (1613–27; Magdeburg)
 Cramer, Johann Jakob (1673–1702; Zürich)
 Cramer, Johann Rudolf (1678–1731; Zürich)
 Crenius, Thom. (1648–1728; Leyden)
 Crocius, Lud. Mich. (c. 1673)
 Croius (?), Jo. (18th century; Oxford)

D
 Dachs, Fried. Bernh. (c. 1726; Utrecht)
 Dalmaki, Laurentius (c. 1643; Hunga)
 Danz, Jo. Andr. (1654–1728; Jena)
 Dassovius, Theod. (d. 1721; Wittenberg; Kiel)
 Delitzsch, Franz (1813–1890; Leipzig
 Diogo Correa Coelho (c. 1990; [Born Brazilian]{Australia})
 Disma, P. (c. 1757; Italy)
 Dithmar, Just. Christ. (c. 1706; Dutch Republic?)
 Donatus, Franc. (d. 1635; Rome)
 Dorothea Maria (wife of Duke John; 17th century; Saxe-Weimar)
 Dove, John (c. 1746; London)
 Johannes van den Driesche, "Drusius" (1550–1616; Leyden)
 Drusius, Jo. II. (son of preceding; 1588–1609; Chichester)
 John Duncan (1796 Aberdeen – 26 February 1870)

E
 Adam Easton (Benedictine; d. 1397; Hereford)
 Ebertus, Jac. (1549–1614; Frankfort-on-the-Oder)
 Ebertus, Theod. (d. 1630; Frankfort-on-the-Oder)
 Alfred Edersheim (1825-1889)
 Eggers, Jo. (c. 1719; Basel; Leyden)
 Einem, Jo. Justus von (c. 1738; Germany)
 Einsiedel, Marg. Sybilla (wife of Conrad Löser; c. 1670; Saxony)
 Eisenmenger, Joh. And. (1654–1704; Heidelberg)
 Elisabeth (Abbess of Herfort; d. 1680)
 Empereur, Constantin l' (1570–1648; Leyden)
 Etheridge, J. W. (c. 1856; Penzance)
 Eustochium Julia (5th century; Rome)

F
 Fabricius, Ern. Christ. (c. 1792)
 Fabricius, Fred. (1642–1703; Wittenberg)
 Fabricius, Johann Albert (1668–1736)
 Fagius Paul(us) (1504–49; Cambridge)
 Faust, Jo. Friedr. (c. 1706; Germany)
 Ferrand, Lud. (c. 1640–1700; Paris)
 Figueiro, Petrusa (c. 1615)
 Fourmont, Étienne, the elder (1683–1745; Paris)
 Franciscus, Maria (Capuchin)
 Franck, Sebastian (c. 1537; Ulm)
 Francke, August Hermann (1663–1727)
 Frey, Jo. Ludw. (1682–1759; Basel)
 Friesen, Henr. Kath. (17th century; Saxony)
 Frommann, Erh. Andr. (1722–74; Monastery of Berge, Magdeburg)
 Fronmüller, Conrad (c. 1679; Altdorf?)
 Fuller, Nicol. (1557–1626; Salisbury)

G
 Gaffarellus, Jacobus/Jacques Gaffarel (1601–81)
 Gagnier, Joseph (1670–1740; Oxford)
 Galatinus, Petrus/Galatino, Pietro Colonna (c. 1518)
 Galle, Joh. (c. 1711; Upsala)
 Gaudia, Barthol. Valverdio (Spain)
 Gaulmyn, Gilb. (d. 1667; France)
 Gejerus, Martin (1614–80; Freiberg)
 Genebrard, Gilbert (1537–97; Samur)
 Georgius Gentius (1618–87; Freiberg)
 Gesenius, Wilhelm (1786-1842; Halle an der Saale)
 Georgios, Chrysococca (1340-56? Greece)
 Germberg, Herm. (1604)
 Giggeius, Ant. (d. 1632; Milan)
 Gill, John (1697–1771; London)
 Graser, Conrad (d. 1613; Germany)
 Groddeck, Gaḅr. (1672–1709; Danzig)
 Guidacerius (Guidacier), Agathius (c. 1540)
 Guisius, Gulielmus (1653–90; Oxford)
 Guyenne, De (c. 1625; Paris)

H
 Habert, Susanna (d. 1633; France)
 Hackspan, Theodor (1607–59; Altdorf)
 Haller, Albert (1708–77; Bern)
 Hanel, Melchior (c. 1661; Prague)
 Hannecken, Meno (1595–1677; Marburg
 Hardt, Anton Jul. van der (1707–85; Helmstädt)
 Hardt, Herm. van der (1660–1746; Helmstädt)
 Hartmann, Anton Theodor (1774–1838; Rostock)
 Hartmann, Jo. Phil. (c. 1708)
 Hartmann, Martin (1851; living; Berlin)
 Havemann, Chris. (17th century)
 Hebenstreit, Johann Chr. (1686–1756; Leipsic)
 Helenius, Engelbart (c. 1727; Sweden)
 Helvig, Christoph (1581–1617; Giessen)
 Hepburn, James Bonaventure (1573–1621; Scotland)
 Hilpert, Jo. (c. 1651)
 Hinckelmann, Alr. (1652–95; Hamburg)
 Hirt, Jo. Frid. (1719–84; Wittenberg)
 Hochsteter, Andreas Adam (1668–1717; Tübingen)
 Holten, Albert (c. 1675; Tübingen)
 Hommel, Car. Ferd. (1722–81; Leipsic)
 Honorius (Monk; 1452)
 Hottinger, Johann Heinrich I. (1620–67; Heidelberg)
 Hottinger, Jo. Henr. II. (c. 1704)
 Houting, Henr. (c. 1695)
 Hufnagel, G. F. (c. 1795)
 Huldrich, Jo. Jac. (1683–1731)
 Hulsius, Anton (d. 1685; Holland)
 Husen, Franc. (c. 1676)
 Hyde, Thomas (1631–1703; Oxford)

I
 Ikenius, Conrad (1689–1753; Bremen)
 Imbonatus, Carlus Josephus/Carlo Giuseppe Imbonati (d. 1696; Rome)

J
 Jacobs, Henry (1608–52; Oxford)
 Janvier, Renatus Ambros. (1613–82; Paris)
 Johannes Lucæ (1406; Italy)
Franciscus Junius (the elder)
 Justinianus, Augustin (1470–1531; "Episcopus Nebiensis")

K
 Keller, Gottl. Wilh. (17th century; Jena [?])
Kinghorn, Joseph (1766–1832; Norwich)
 Kircher, Athanasius (Jesuit; 1602–80; Rome)
 Knorr, Christian, Baron de Rosenroth (1636–89; Sulzbach)
 Koccher, Herrm. Fried. (c. 1783; Jena)
 König, Friedrich Eduard (1846; Reichenbach)
 König, Sam. (1670–1750; Bern)
 Köppen, Nic. (c. 1709; Greifswald)
 Kosegarten, Johann Gottfried Ludwig  (1792–1860; Greifswald)
 Krafft, Karl (c. 1839; Ansbach)
 Kraut, Paul (c. 1703; Lund)
 Kyber, David (16th century; Strasburg?)

L
 Lagarde, Paul de (1827–91; Göttingen)
 Lakemacher, Joh. Gothofr. (1695–1736; Helmstädt)
 Lange, Jo. Joachim (1670–1744; Halle)
 Lange, W. (c. 1710)
 Langens, Henr. (c. 1720; Dutch Republic)
 Lederlin, Jo. Henr. (1672–1737; Strasburg)
 Lehmann, Ge. Heinrich (1619–99; Leipsic)
 Lehmann, Maria Barbara (c. 1700; Schnekengrün)
 Leib, Chilian (Prior; 1471–1548; Rebdorf)
 Le Long, Jac. (1665–1721; Paris)
 Lenz, Jo. Leonh. (c. 1700; Germany)
 Lepusculus, Sebastian (c. 1516; Germany)
 Leusden, Johann (1624–99; Utrecht)
 Leydecker, Melchior (1642–1722; Utrecht, put on Index Librorum Prohibitorum by the Catholic Church)
 Lightfoot, John (1602–75; Ely)
 Lipomanni, Marco (c. 1440; Venice)
 Losa, Isabella (d. 1564; Cordova)
 Loscan, Joh. Frid. (c. 1710; Germany)
 Losius, Jo. Justus (c. 1706; Germany)
 Lowe, W. H. (Cambridge)
 Ludolf, Susanna Magdalena (c. 1700; Frankfort-on-the-Main)
 Ludwig, Christ. L. (b. 1663, Landshut; d. 1732)
 Lund, Dan. (b. 1666, Fogdoë; d. 1746, Strengnäs)

M
 McCaul, Alexander (b. 1799, Dublin; d. 1863, London)
 Mai, Joh. Hen. (1688–1732; Giessen)
 Malamina, Cæsar (c. 1774; Florence)
 Manfred (?), King (d. 1266; Germany)
 Mannetti, Giannozzo (b. 1396, Florence; d. 1459, Naples)
 Maria Eleonore (wife of Ludwig Philipp of Pfalz; c. 1669)
 Maria Elizabeth (daughter of Duke Christian Albrecht; c. 1706; Schleswig-Holstein)
 Marchina, Martha (d. 1646; Naples)
 Margoliouth, David Samuel (1858–1940)  Oxford)
 Margoliouth, G. (living; London)
 Margoliouth, Moses (b. 1820, Suwałki; d. 1881, London)
 Marini, Marco (b. 1541, Brescia; d. 1594, Brescia)
 Matthias Aquarius (c. 1581)
 Matthias, Elias (Germany)
 Meelführer, Rud. Martin (b. 1670, Ansbach; d. 1729)
 Mercer, Jo. (d. 1570; Uzès)
 Meyer, Jo. (c. 1693; Dutch Republic)
 Michaelis, Johann David (1717–1791)
 Michaelis, Johann Heinrich (1668–1738)
 Midhorp, Joh. (c. 1562)
 Mieg, Jo. Frid. (b. 1700, Marburg; d. 1788, Heidelberg)
 Mill, David (b. 1692, Königsberg; d. 1756, Utrecht)
 Millard, Alan
 Molinaea, Maria (17th century)
 Molitor, Christoph. (c. 1659; Altdorf)
 Molza-Porrino, Tarquinia (d. 1600; Modena)
 Bernard de Montfaucon (b. 1655, Soulange; d. 1741, Paris)
 Moré, Eugène (c. 1837; France)
 More, Henry (b. 1614, Grantham; d. 1687, Cambridge)
 Morin, Etienne (b. 1625, Caen; d. 1700, Amsterdam)
 Morin, Jean (b. 1591, Blois; d. 1659, Paris)
 Muhl, Henr. (b. 1666, Bremen; d. c. 1730, Kiel)
 Muhl, Jos. (Holstein)
 Muis, Simon de (b. 1587, Orléans; d. 1644, Paris)
 Münster, Sebastian (Minorite; b. 1489, Ingelheim; d. 1552, Basel)
 Murner, Thomas (Minorite; b. 1475; d. 1537?)
 Alexander Murray (b. 1775 Dunkitterick, Galloway; d. 1813 Edinburgh)
 Myerlin, David Fr. (d. 1778; Frankfort-on-the-Main)

N
 Nagel, Jo. Andr. Mich. (1740–1788; Altdorf)
 Neale, Thomas (1569-1569; Regius Professor of Hebrew: Oxford, England)
 Nicholas Of Lyra (Nicolaus Lyranus) (c. 1270–1349; Paris)
 Nigri (Schwartz), Peter (c. 1475; Cadana?)
 Fr. Nork (1803–50; Germany [actually Fr. Korn])
 Norrelius, Andr. (c. 1720; Upsala)
 Novenianus, Phil. (?) (c. 1520; Hasfurtensis?)

O
 Odhelius, Laur. (d. 1691; Upsala)
 Opfergeld, Friedrich (1668–1746; Breslau)
 Opitius, Paul Friedr. (1684–1745; Kiel)
 Osterbröck, Aaggaens.
 Otho, Jo. Henr. (d. 1719; Lausanne)
 Ouserl, Phil. (c. 1714; Frankfort-on-the Main)
 Owmann, Mart. Jac. (c. 1705; Germany)

P
 Pagninus, Xanthus/?Santes Pagnini (b. 1470, Lucca; d. 1536, Lyon)
 Palmroot, Jo. (c. 1696; Upsala)
 Pasinus, Jos. (b. 1687, Padua; d. 1770, Turin)
 Pastritius, Jo
 Paula, Cornelia (d. 408; Rome)
 Dom Pedro II (Emperor of Brazil; 1825–91)
 Pellikan, Konrad (1478–1556; Zürich)
 Peringer, Gustav (b. 1657; Upsala; Stockholm)
 Peritz, Ismar J. (living; Syracuse, US)
 Perreau, Pietro (Abbé; living, Parma)
 Pertsch, W. H. F. (c. 1720; Jena)
 Peter of St. Omer (1296; Paris)
 Petit, Pietro Giov, de (d. 1740; Rome)
 Petrus de Alexandrica (Augustinian; 1342)
 Petrus Montagnana (?) (1478; Italy)
 Pfeiffer, August (b. 27 October 1640, Lauenburg an der Elbe; d. 11 January 1698, Lübeck)
 Pico de la Mirandola (d. 1494; Italy)
 Picques, L. (c. 1670; Paris)
 Pistorius, Jo. Nidanus (b. 1544, Nidda; d. 1607, Freiburg im Breisgau)
 Plantavitius, Johannes/Jean VI. Plantavit de la Pause (Bishop; 1625–48; Lodève)
 Plato of Tivoli (Plato Tiburtinus, 1116; Barcelona)
 Pontacus, Arnold (Bishop; d. 1605; Bazas)
 Postel, Guillaume. (b. 1505. Delorie; d. 1581, Paris)
 Prache, Hilaric (b. 1614, Teutschel; d. 1679, London)
 Prideaux, Humphrey (Dean; b. 1648, Padstow; d. 1724, Norwich)

Q
 Quinquaboreus (Cinqarbre), Johannes (d. 1587; Paris)

R
 Rabe, Joh. Jac. (1710–98; Ansbach)
 Rapheleng, Franc. (b. 1539; Lannoy)
 Raymund Martin/Ramón Martí (Monk; c. 1286)
 Raymund de Peñaforte (Dominican; 1175–1275; Barcelona)
 Reineccius, Chr. (b. 1668, Großmühlingen; d. 1752, Weißenfels)
 Reiske, Johann Jakob (b. 1716, Zörbig; d. 1774, Leipzig)
 Reland, Adrian (b. 1676, Ryp; d. 1718, Utrecht)
 Rendtorf, Jo. (Hamburg)
 Reuchlin, Johann (b. 1455, Pforzheim; d. 1522, Stuttgart)
 Rezzonius, Franc. (b. 1731, Como; d. 1780)
 Rhegius, Urbanus (c. 1535; Celle)
 Rhenferdius, Jac. (b. 1654, Mühlheim; d. 1712, Franeker)
 Ritmeier, Chr. Henr. (c. 1697)
 Rivinius, Tileman Andreas (b. 1601, Halle; d. 1656, Leipzig)
 Robustellus, Jo. (1655; Rome)
 Rohan, Anna, Princess of (c. 1634)
 Rönnow, Magn. (d. 1690)
 Rossi, Giovanni Bernardo de (1742–1831; Parma)

S
 Sebutia, Cæcilia (c. 1683; Rome)
 Sigæa, Aloysa (wife of Alfonso du Guevas; d. 1569; Toledo)
 Sacy, Isaac Silvestre de (1758–1838; Paris)
 Salchli (?), Jo. Jac. (b. 1694, Eggwil; d. 1774, Bern)
 Saracena, Ludovica (wife of Marcus Offredus; c. 1606; France)
 Sartorius, Jo. (b. 1656, Eperies; d. 1729, Danzig)
 Saubert, Jo. (1638–88; Helmstädt)
 Scheidt, Balth. (1614–70; Strasburg)
 Scherping, Jacob (c. 1737; Stockholm)
 Scherzer, Jo. Adam (b. 1628, Eger; d. 1683, Leipzig)
 Schickard, Wilhelm (b. 1592, Herrenberg; d. 1635, Tübingen)
 Schindler, Valentin (d. 1604; Wittenberg; Helmstädt)
 Schmidt, Sebastian (c. 1656; Strasburg)
 Schnelle, Sebald (1621–51; Nuremberg)
 Schoettgen, Jo. Christ. (1687–1751)
 Scholl, J. C. F. (Tübingen)
 Schotanus, Christ. (b. 1603, Scheng; d. 1671, Franeker)
 Schramm, Jonas Conr. (c. 1700; Helmstädt)
 Schreckenfuchs, Erasmus Oswald (1511–75; Tübingen)
 Schroeder, Jo. Joachim (1680–1756; Marburg)
 Schulten, Albert (1686–1750; Dutch Republic)
 Schulten, Car. (c. 1725; Lund)
 Schulten, Heinrich Albert (1749–93; Dutch Republic)
 Schulten, Jo. Jac. (1716–78; Dutch Republic)
 Schurman, Anna Maria van (1607–78; Altona)
 Schwenter, Daniel (1585–1636; Nuremberg)
 Scotus, Jo. Duns (d. 1308, Scotland)
 Sebastianus, Aug. Nouzanus (c. 1532; Marburg)
 Seidel, Casp. (c. 1638; Hamburg)
 Seiferheld, J. L. (18th century)
 Seyfried, Christ. (c. 1664)
 Seyfried, Henr. (c. 1663; Altdorf)
 Sgambatus, Scipio (c. 1703; Italy)
 Sheringham, Robert (b. 1602, Guestwick; d. 1678, Cambridge)
 Siegfried, Carl (b. 1830, Magdeburg; d. Jena)
 Smith, Thomas (b. 1638, London; d. 1710)
 Sommer, Gottfr. Chris. (c. 1734; Gotha)
 Sonneschmid, Jo. Just. (c. 1719; Jena?)
 Spalding, G. L. (b. 1762, Barth; d. 1811, Friedrichsfelde)
 Sprecher, Jo. Died. (c. 1703; Helmstädt)
 Springer, Daniel (1656–1708; Breslau)
 Staemmen, Christoph. van (c. 1661; Preza-Holsatus?)
 Starke, Heinrich Benedict (b. 1672, Engelen; d. 1717, Leipsic)
 Steinmetz, Joh. Andr. (b. 1689, Gr. Knicymtzd; d. 1762)
 Strack, Herrmann L. (living; Berlin)
 Stridzberg, Nic. H. (c. 1731; Lund)
 Struvius, Jo. Jul. (c. 1697; Germany)
 Stucki, Johann Wilhelm (b. 1542, Zurich; d. 1607, Zurich)
 Surenhuys, Willem (d. 1729; Amsterdam)
 Svetonio, Agost. (Italy)

T
 Tanfeld, Elisabeth (d. 1639; London)
 Charles Taylor (Hebraist)
 Francis Taylor (1589-1656)
 Johannes Terentius, or Terrentius, (Jean Schreck), Swiss Jesuit (b. 1580, Constance; d. 1630, China)
 Theobald (?) (Subprior; 14th century; Paris)
 Immanuel Tremellius (1510 – 9 October 1580)
 Trigland, Jacobus (d. 1705; Leyden)
 Tychsen, Oluf Gerhard (1734–1815; Rostock)

U
 Ulmann, Jo. (c. 1663; Strasburg)
 Urbanus Henricus Rhegius (Urbanus Rhegius) (c. 1535; Celle)
 Ury, Jo. (d. 1796; Oxford)
 Cnaeus Cornelius Uythage (c. 1680; Leyden)

V
 Bartolomè Valverde y Gandìa Bartholomaeus Valverdius (Spain)
 Varen, Aug. (d. 1684; Rostock)
 Vatablé/Watebled, François  (d. 1547; Paris)
 Vehe, Matthias (d.1590)
 Vinding, Jo. Paul (c. 1633; Dutch Republic ?)
 Voorst, Dick Cornelis van (b. 1751, Delft; d. 1833, Amsterdam)
 Voss, Dionysius (b. 1612, Dordrecht; d. 1633, Amsterdam)
 Voysin (Vicinus), Jos. de (c. 1635; Paris)

W

 Wagenseil, Helena Sybilla (c. 1700; Altendorf)
 Wagenseil, Johann Christoph (1635–1703; Altdorf)
 Wakefield, Robert (d. 1537; Oxford)
 Wallin, Georg (c. 1722; Holm)
 Walper, Otto (Latin: Otho Gualtperius) (1543-1624; Marburg)
 Walter, Jo. (c. 1710)
 Walther, Christ. (c. 1705; Königsberg)
 Warner, Levin (d. 1663; Dutch Republic)
 Weiganmeier, Georg (1555–99; Tübingen)
 John Wemyss (c. 1579–1636)
 Wessel, Joh. (John Wessel Goesport) (b. 1419, Groningen; d. 1489)
 Widmannstetter, Johann Albrecht (b. 1500; d. 1559, Wellingen)
 Wilkins, David (b. 1685; d. 1748, Hadleigh)
 Winckler, Jo. Fried. (b. 1679, Wertheim; d. 1738, Germany)
 Winer, Jo. Ge. Bened. (1789–1858; Leipsic)
 Witter, Henr. Bernh. (c. 1703; Germany)
 Woeldicke, Marcus (1699–1750; Copenhagen)
 Wolf (?), Georg (c. 1557; Grimma)
 Wolf, Jo. Christoph. (1688–1739; Hamburg)
 Wolf, Jo. W. (d. 1571; Gera)
 Wolph (?), Jo. Hac. (Zürich)
 Wotton, William (1666–1720; London)
 Johann Wülfer (1651–1724; Nuremberg)
 Wünsche, August (living; Dresden)

Z
 Zanolini, Antonio (1693–1762; Padua)
 Andreas Christoph Zeller (c. 1711; Maulbronn)
 Gustav Georg Zeltner (1672–1738; Altdorf)

See also
Hebraism

References

Bibliography

The bibliography of that article is below:
 Moritz Steinschneider, Christliche Hebraisten, in Zeit. für Hebr. Bibl. i. 50 et seq.;
 Gesenius, Gesch. der Hebr. Sprache, passim, Leipsic, 1815;
 Zunz, Z. G. pp. 1 et seq. (re-published in G. S. i. 41 et seq.);
 L. Geiger, Studium der Hebraisch Sprache in Deutschland, Breslau, 1870;
 J. Perles, Beiträge zur Geschichte der Hebraisch und Aramaisch Studien, pp. 154 et seq.;
 Meyer Kayserling, Les Hébraisants Chrétiens, in R. E. J. xx. 264 et seq.;
 Kaufmann, Die Vertretung der Jüden Wissenschaft an den Universitäten, in Monatsschrift, xxxix. 145 et seq.;
 S. A. Hirsch, Early English Hebraists, in J. Q. R. xii. 34 et seq.;
 Kauffmann, Jacob Mantino, in R. E. J. xxvii. 30 et seq. (comp. J. Q. R. ix. 500);
 E. Sachau, Orientalische Philologie, in Die Deutschen Universitäten, p. 520, Berlin, 1893;
 William Rosenau, Semitic Studies in American Colleges, Chicago, 1896;
 Moritz Steinschneider, Hebr. Bibl. xx. 65 et seq.;
 Kayserling, A Princess as Hebraist, in J. Q. R. ix. 509.G.

External links
Christian Hebraists in the Netherlands
Hebraic Aspects of the Renaissance: Sources and Encounters (Leiden, 2011)
 "The Strange Career of the Biblia Rabbinica among Christian Hebraists, 1517–1620" by Stephen Burnett (2012)
 Philippe Bobichon, La polémique contre les juifs dans les travaux des hébraïsants chrétiens de France
 Online version of Reuchlin's 1506 De rudimentis hebraicis
 Online version of Walper's 1590 Grammatica linguae sanctae

 
Hebraists
Judeo-Christian topics
Christianity and Judaism
Converts to Christianity from Judaism